Pablo Gonzalvo y Pérez (19 January 1827, Zaragoza18 November 1896, Madrid) was a Spanish painter who specialized in urban landscapes and what are sometimes referred to as interior portraits.

Biography 
He began his studies in Zaragoza, then moved to Madrid, where he enrolled at the Real Academia de Bellas Artes de San Fernando for the academic year of 1845–1846. There, he was a student of  Federico de Madrazo. He later became a member of the Real Academia, as well as a member of the Academia de Bellas Artes de Cádiz, where he would also serve as a Professor.

To widen his cultural perspectives, he made numerous trips to Rome, Venice, Vienna and Istanbul, and exhibited frequently, in Spain and elsewhere. Throughout much of his career, he was supported by the Dukes of Fernán Núñez and Infanta Isabella, Countess of Girgenti.

At the first National Exhibition of Fine Arts in 1856, he received Honorable Mention, followed by a Third Class prize in 1858, and First Class prizes in 1860, 1862 and 1864. In the last instance, his prize was exchanged for the Cross of the Order of Charles III, as two First Prize wins were then the limit. He entered the exhibition again in 1867, and was honored with a commission in the Order.

He also submitted entries to the 1862 International Exhibition in London, the Franco-Spanish Exposition in Bayonne (1864), the Exposition Universelle (1867), where he was awarded a Third Class medal, the 1873 Vienna World's Fair and the World's Columbian Exposition in Philadelphia (1876). He was a personal friend of José Martí, the poet refers to him as 'the good friend' in his poems.

In addition to the Order of Charles III, he received a commission in the Order of Isabella the Catholic, in recognition of his successes at the National Exhibition.

References

Further reading 
 Manuel Osorio y Bernard, Galería biográfica de artistas españoles del siglo XIX [1883-1884], Madrid, Ed. Giner, 1975, página 305.
 Ana García Loranca and Jesús Ramón García-Rama, Pintura del siglo XIX. Aragón, La Rioja, Guadalajara, Zaragoza, Caja de Ahorros y Monte de Piedad de Zaragoza, Aragón y La Rioja, 1992

External links 

 Gonzalvo Pérez, Pablo @ the Gran Enciclopedia Aragonesa
 Obra de Pablo Gonzalvo en el Museo Nacional de Cerámica y de las Artes Suntuarias González Martí  from El brillo de la seda, en las pinturas cenitales del palacio de Dos Aguas

1827 births
1896 deaths
Spanish painters
Spanish genre painters
Order of Isabella the Catholic
Real Academia de Bellas Artes de San Fernando alumni
People from Zaragoza